This is primarily a list of notable translators.  Large sublists have been split off to separate articles.

By text
List of Bible translators
List of Qur'an translators
List of Kural translators
Harry Potter in translation

By target language

Into Arabic
Ahmed Shawqi
Hafez Ibrahim
Ibn al-Muqaffa'
Rifa'a el-Tahtawi
Taha Hussein – translator of Sophocles, Racine, and others
Hafs ibn Albar

Into Albanian
Faik Konitza
Fan Noli
Luan Rama 
Petro Zheji
Robert Shvarc
Mirela Kumbaro

Into Armenian
Levon Ananyan
Vahagn Davtyan
Hovhannes Masehian
Vahan Malezian
Yervant Odian
Nahapet Rusinian
Hamo Sahyan
Vardges Sureniants
Leon Surmelian
Alexander Tsaturian
Rita Vorperian

Into Azerbaijani (Azeri)
Hamlet Isaxanli (Isayev) – translator of poems from Russian, English and French

Into Bulgarian
Albena Bakratcheva
Valeri Petrov
Nikolai B. Popov

Into Chinese
Chen Liangting
Huang Ai – translator of Oliver Twist by Charles Dickens
Mei Yi – translator of How the Steel Was Tempered by Nikolai Ostrovsky
Wang Chong
Wang Weike
Yu Hsi – translator of the Tirukkural

Into Czech
Kamil V. Zvelebil – translator of the Tirukkural and other ancient Tamil works

Into English
List of translators into English

Into Fijian
 Mary Ann Lyth (1811–1890) – English missionary, translator, teacher

Into Finnish
 Pentti Aalto – translator of the Tirukkural

Into French 
Étienne Aignan
Jacques Amyot – produced a famous version of Plutarch's Parallel Lives, later rendered into English by Sir Thomas North
E. S. Ariel – translator of the Tirukkural
Charles Baudelaire – produced a famous and immensely influential translation of the works of Edgar Allan Poe
Georges Jean-Aubry
Yves Bonnefoy – noted contemporary translator, particularly of English poetry
Joséphine Colomb – translator from Italian
Marie De Cotteblanche (c1520 – c1584) – French noble woman known for her skill in languages and translation of works from Spanish to French.
Chateaubriand – translator of Milton's epic poem Paradise Lost into French prose
Anne Dacier – translator of classical Greek works
Alain Daniélou – translator of the Tirukkural, Silappathikaram, Manimekalai and other works
Augustine De Rothmaler - translator of Johannes V. Jensen's Histoires du Himmerland
Gnanou Diagou – translator of the Tirukkural
Jean-Baptiste Benoît Eyriès – translator of travel and geography works, and Fantasmagoriana
Antoine Galland – translator of the first European edition of the Arabian Nights
Jean Hyppolite – translator of Hegel and popularized his work
Louis Jacolliot – translator of the Tirukkural
Marie Léra – translator of Brewster's Millions
Leconte de Lisle – translator of classical Greek authors
Pierre-Eugène Lamairesse – translator of the Tirukkural, Kamasutra and other Indian works
Jean Baptiste Lefebvre de Villebrune – translator of medical and philological works into French
Stéphane Mallarmé – translator of the poetry of E. A. Poe
J. C. Mardrus – translator of the Arabian Nights
Lucie Paul-Margueritte – translator of Dracula
Madeleine Rolland, translator of Tess of the d'Urbervilles
Boris Vian – translator of The Big Sleep by Raymond Chandler as Le grand sommeil (1948), The Lady in the Lake by Raymond Chandler  as La dame du lac (1948), The World of Null-A  by A. E. van Vogt, as Le Monde des Å (1958)
 François Gros – translator of the Paripatal (part of the Eight Anthologies)

Into Galician 
 Fátima Rodríguez (b. 1961) – Spanish writer, translator, professor

Into German 
Zoë Beck – translator of several books by Pippa Goldschmidt and others, as well as popular television series
August Friedrich Caemmerer – translator of the Tirukkural
Karl Graul – translator of the Tirukkural
Markus Hediger – translator of novels of Swiss writer Alice Rivaz and poems of Nicolas Bouvier
Henny Koch – first translator of Mark Twain's Adventures of Huckleberry Finn in 1890
Friedrich Rückert – translator of the Tirukkural 
Albert Schweitzer
Schlegel and Tieck – produced the most famous German translation of Shakespeare
Johann Heinrich Voss – translator of classical poetry into German

Into Greek

Into Chichewa/Chinyanja
Benedicto Wokomaatani Malunga – translator of Things Fall Apart

Into Gujarati
Kantilal L. Kalani – translator of the Tirukkural
P. C. Kokila – translator of the Tirukkural

Into Hebrew 
Abraham bar Hiyya Ha-Nasi – translator of scientific works from Arabic into Hebrew (for further translation into Latin by Plato of Tivoli)
Yehuda Alharizi – translator of Maimonides' Guide for the Perplexed and Arabic maqama poetry
Cabret – translator from Latin – end of 14th century
T. Carmi – translator of Shakespeare
Ibn Tibbon family – translator of Greek, Roman, Arab, and Jewish works from Arabic
Emperor D. Pedro II – translator of poetry by Luís de Camões from Portuguese
Abraham Regelson – translator of literature from English and Yiddish
Yitzhak Salkinsohn – relatively early (19th century) translator of Milton and Shakespeare
Abraham Shlonsky – translator of Shakespeare, Gogol, and others
Adin Steinsaltz – translator of dozens of volumes of Talmud from Aramaic
Shaul Tchernichovsky – prolific literary translator

Into Hindi
Ashok Aatreya
Hariram Acharya
Nandkishor Acharya
S.H. Vatsyayan 'Agyeya'
Agneya
Harivansh Rai 'Bachchan'
Veeren Kumar Baranwal
Dharmveer Bharti
Nand Chaturvedi
Rajkamal Chaudhri
Arun Chopda
Chandrakant Devtale
Surendra Dixit
Waqar Fatmi
Jaya Goswami
Gagan Gill
Teji Grover
 B. D. Jain – translator of the Tirukkural
 Govindaraj Shastri Jain – translator of the Tirukkural
Shyoraj Singh Jain
Rajesh Joshi
Anil Janvijay
Priyadarshi Thakur 'Khayal'
Kamlanath
Vishnu Khare
Jitendra Kumar
Vijay Kumar
Mukund Lath
Vanshi Maheshwari
Shriprakash Mishra
Harshdev Madhav
Vidyaniwas Mishra
 Sankar Raju Naidu – translator of the Tirukkural
Chandraprabha Pandeya
Prakash Parimal
 Rajan Pillai – translator of the Tirukkural
Suman Pokhrel
Uday Prakash
Hemant Shesh
 Khan Chand Rahit – translator of the Tirukkural
 Khenand Rakat – translator of the Tirukkural
Giridhar Rathi
Padma Sachdev
 Ananda Sandhidut – translator of the Tirukkural
Vinod Sharma
Mohan Shrotriya
Sadashiv Shrotriya
Krishna Murari Sharma
Rajiv Saxena
Sudhir Saxena
 K. Seshadri – translator of the Tirukkural
Varyam Singh
Kedarnath Singh
Anand Kumar Singh
Somdutt
Raghuvir Sahay
Ramesh Chandra Shah
Munmun Sarkar
I.K. Sharma
Kalanath Shastri
Lakshman Saumitra
Bhaskar Shri
Ashok Vajpeyi
Udayan Vajpeyi
Shrikant Verma
Krishna Baldev Vaid
Shivkuti lal Verma
Ganga Prasad Vimal
M. G. Venkatakrishnan – translator of the Tirukkural

Into Interlingua 
 Alexander Gode – translator of scientific and medical literature into Interlingua

Into Italian 
Italo Calvino – translator of Raymond Queneau's Les fleurs bleues (The Blue Flowers)
Ettore Capriolo – translator of McLuhan, Camus, Salman Rushdie
Eduardo De Filippo – translator of Shakespeare's The Tempest into 18th century Neapolitan
Vincenzo Mantovani – translator of works by William Faulkner, Henry Miller, Philip Roth, Salman Rushdie, Saul Bellow, Malcolm Lowry, Charles Bukowski, Isaac Asimov, Richard Ford, William Gaddis, John Updike, Norman Mailer, Bernard Malamud, Jerzy Kosinski and others
Grazyna Miller – translator of Pope John Paul II's Roman Triptych: Meditations from Polish into Italian
Cesare Pavese – translator of Melville, Dickens and others
Fernanda Pivano – translator of works by Ernest Hemingway, Edgar Lee Masters, Francis Scott Fitzgerald, William Faulkner, Thornton Wilder, Allen Ginsberg, Lawrence Ferlinghetti, Gregory Corso and many other English-language authors
Elio Vittorini – translator of works by Ernest Hemingway, William Saroyan, John Steinbeck, Erskine Caldwell, William Faulkner, D. H. Lawrence and Edgar Allan Poe

Into Japanese 
Ogai Mori – translator of Goethe and Andersen (from the German)
Shuzo Matsunaga – translator of the Tirukkural
Haruki Murakami – translator of Raymond Chandler
Maruya Saiichi – translator of Joyce
Takanobu Takahashi – translator of the Tirukkural

Into Juhuri 
Sergey Izgiyaev – translator of the libretto of Uzeyir Hajibeyov's opera Layla and Majnun, and poems by Mikhail Lermontov, Suleyman Stalsky, Gamzat Tsadasa, Rasul Gamzatov and other poets

Into Kannada
L. Gundappa – translator of the Tirukkural
B. M. Srikanthaiah – translator of the Tirukkural
S. Srinivasan – translator of the Tirukkural

Into Konkani
N. Purushothama Maliaya – translator of the Tirukkural
Suresh Gundu Amonkar – translator of the Tirukkural, Dhammapada, Bhagavad Gita, Gospel of John and Dnyaneshwari.

Into Latin 
Constanzo Beschi – translator of the Tirukkural
Boniface Consiliarius – translator of numerous church documents from Greek into Latin
Herman of Carinthia – translator of Arabic scientific texts into Latin
Karl Graul – translator of the Tirukkural
St. Jerome – produced the Latin Vulgate version of the Bible; is regarded among Christians as the patron saint of translators
Robert of Ketton and Herman of Carinthia – rendered the Qur'an into Latin (1142–1143)
William of Moerbeke – medieval translator of Aristotle and ancient Greek science

Into Malayalam
Vennikkulam Gopala Kurup – translator of the Tirukkural
G. Balakrishnan Nair – translator of the Tirukkural
Tiruvallam G. Bhaskaran Nair – translator of the Tirukkural

Into Marathi
Sane Guruji – translator of the Tirukkural

Into Meitei
Soibam Rebika Devi – translator of the Tirukkural

Into Nepali
Abhi Subedi
Bhanubhakta Acharya
Laxmi Prasad Devkota
Suman Pokhrel

Into Persian 
Jalal Al-e-Ahmad – translator of works by Camus, Sartre, Dostoyevsky, etc.
Lili Golestan – translator of works by Andrew Andry, Oriana Fallaci, Christopher Frank, etc.

Into Polish 
Tadeusz Boy-Żeleński – prolific translator of French classic literature; murdered by the Nazis.
Stanisław Czerski – translator of the fables of Phaedrus
Ignacy Krasicki – translator of Plutarch and Ossian.
Bolesław Leśmian – poet who translated the tales of Edgar Allan Poe.
Maciej Słomczyński – translator of James Joyce's Ulysses and of the complete works of Shakespeare.
Robert Stiller – prolific translator of classic and contemporary literature, from a score of languages, European as well as Oriental.
Władysław Syrokomla – translator of Latin, French, German, Russian and Ukrainian poets, including works by Béranger, Goethe, Heine, Lermontov, Nekrasov and Shevchenko.
Julian Tuwim – translator of Alexander Pushkin and other Russian poets.
Adam Ważyk – translator of Alexander Pushkin's Eugene Onegin.

Into Portuguese 
Machado de Assis
Monteiro Lobato
Carlos do Amaral Freire
Daniel Galera
Décio Pignatari – translator of Dante, Shakespeare, Goethe and McLuhan
Abraham Usque

Into Punjabi 
 Tarlochan Singh Bedi – translator of the Tirukkural

Into Russian 
Aleksey Mikhalyov – translator of John Steinbeck's East of Eden and many other authors, as well as numerous films and cartoons
Ivan Bunin – translator of The Song of Hiawatha
Alexander Druzhinin – translator of several of Shakespeare's plays and the poetry of George Crabbe
Nikolay Gnedich – made the classical translation of The Iliad
J. J. Glazov – translator of the Tirukkural and the Cilappatikaram
Mikhail Lozinsky – made the classical translation of The Divine Comedy
Samuil Marshak – translator of Shakespeare's sonnets, among his other works
Midori Miura – translator of Non-chan kumo ni noru by Momoko Ishii
Vladimir Nabokov – translator of Alice in Wonderland and Lolita
Boris Pasternak – translator of Faust and Hamlet
Viktor Golyshev – translator of Light in August, One Flew Over the Cuckoo's Nest, All the King's Men, Theophilus North, 1984, Other Voices, Other Rooms, Set This House on Fire, Pulp and other books; he mostly worked on American literature
Rita Rait-Kovaleva – translator of The Catcher in the Rye and other works, including those by William Faulkner, Franz Kafka and Heinrich Böll
Sarang Esfandiari – translator from English, Serbian, Spanish, Croatian, Bosnian, Turkish and Russian

Into Sanskrit
S. N. Sriramadesikan – translator of the Tirukkural

Into Saurashtra
S. S. Ram – translator of the Tirukkural

Into Spanish 
Jorge Luis Borges – translator of many English, French, and German works into Spanish
Margarita Diez-Colunje y Pombo (1838-1919) – translator from French into Spanish
Javier Marías – translator of many English works into Spanish

Into Swahili 
Julius Nyerere – first president of Tanzania, translated Shakespeare into Swahili

Into Swedish
Carl August Hagberg – translator of Shakespeare

Into Tamil
Virai Kaviraja Pandithar – translator of Saundarya Lahari

See also
Literature
Philosophy
Translation
Self-translation
List of translators into English
List of women translators

References

Lists of people by occupation
 
Translation-related lists